George Edward Gouraud (30 June 1842 – 20 February 1912) was an American Civil War recipient of the Medal of Honor who later became famous for introducing the new Edison Phonograph cylinder audio recording technology to England in 1888.

Civil war
He was the son of the French engineer François Fauvel Gouraud (1808–1847) who came to the US in 1839 to introduce the daguerrotype technology for photography. Both parents died in the summer of 1847.  Gouraud fought for the United States Army during the Civil War 1861–1865, and received the Medal of Honor for bravery as a captain with the 3rd New York Volunteer Cavalry on November 30, 1864. He was later brevetted lieutenant colonel.  After the war, he became a companion of the New York Commandery of the Military Order of the Loyal Legion of the United States.

Working for Edison
He moved to London at the behest of American Railway magnate William Jackson Palmer to promote the Edison telegraph system. Gouraud did not meet Edison himself until 1874 when the latter was sent to demonstrate new equipment that he had invented to the British Post Office. As an enthusiast of new electric inventions, in the late 1880s and early 1890s he had many gadgets installed in his house at Beulah Hill, Upper Norwood in South London, which he renamed "Little Menlo" after Menlo Park, New Jersey where Edison's research facility was situated.

The Edison phonograph
In 1888, Thomas Edison sent his "Perfected" Phonograph to Gouraud in London and on 14 August 1888, Gouraud introduced the phonograph to London in a press conference, including the playing of a  piano and cornet recording of Arthur Sullivan's "The Lost Chord", one of the first recordings of music ever made.

A series of parties followed, introducing the phonograph to members of society at "Little Menlo". Sullivan was invited to one of these on 5 October 1888. After dinner, he recorded a speech to be sent to Thomas Edison, saying, in part:

Gouraud assembled a small team of recordists who travelled the country promoting the phonograph and were also involved in taking the voices of many great Victorians. In 1890 he conceived the making of three cylinder records of personalities related to the Crimean War to be played for charity in aid of distressed old soldiers from that campaign. On May 15, 1890, Charles Stytler travelled to Freshwater the Isle of Wight to record Lord Tennyson (1809–1892) reading The Charge of the Light Brigade.
July 30, 1890, Florence Nightingale (1820–1910) addressing her "dear old comrades of Balaclava" from 10 South Street, Park Lane, London, her home. The recordist was C.R.Johnson 
August 2, 1890, Martin Lanfried (1834–1902) playing a bugle in the Edison House, London, bugle used at the Battle of Waterloo in 1815.

Later years
In 1898 Gouraud met Horace Short, youngest of the three Short Brothers of later aviation fame and for two years financed his researches into compressed-air amplification in Hove, Sussex, England. The invention—an improvement on Edison's Aerophone of 1878—was named the Gouraudphone and demonstrated at the Exposition Universelle (1900) in Paris. In 1900 Horace introduced his brothers Eustace and Oswald to Gouraud who also financed them and gave them workshop space at Hove to develop their balloons intended for military observation. By 1904 Gouraud was the "Governor General" of French sugar millionaire Jacques Lebaudy's fictional "Empire of the Sahara" and speaking of offering his son's regiment, the 17th Lancers, as Lebaudy's Guard of Honour. In 1909 he went bankrupt.

Family
He was the son of the French engineer Francis Fauvel Gouraud (1808–1847) who came to the US in 1839 to introduce the daguerrotypes technology for photography. Both parents died in the summer of 1847 and George and his older sister Clemence (b. 1838)  were thus orphaned.  George was married in New York in 1870 to Florence Willis Snow (1845–1907) and the family moved to London.  His first wife died in Brighton in 1907. In 1909 he was married again, in Paris to the Norwegian composer Helga Smith-Hald (born 1877), niece to the painter Hans Dahl. They resided in France and Switzerland.

George Gouraud died in 1912 in Vevey, Switzerland, only a week after his son Bayard Gouraud had died from a heart failure while returning home to England from India where he served in the 17th Lancers, a cavalry regiment of the British Army. Another son was ragtime songwriter Jackson Gouraud (1874–1910) who in 1901 became the third husband to heiress and orientalist Aimée Crocker (1864–1941). A third son was composer and broadcasting pionéer Powers Gouraud (1881–1954), who married to Gladys Crocker, who was Aimée Crocker's daughter from her first marriage to Richard Porter Ashe. The daughter Theodora Florence Goudard (1876–1943) was married at St Paul's, Knightsbridge in London, 1899 to Reginald Courtenay Gayer (1871–1940). His eldest son was George Fauvel Gouraud (1872–1915), a lawyer that also wrote poetry.

Medal of Honor citation
Rank and Organization:
Captain and aide-de-camp, U.S. Volunteers. Place and Date: At Honey Hill, S.C., 30 November 1864. Birth: New York, N.Y. Date of Issue: 21 August 1893.

Citation:

See also

List of Medal of Honor recipients

References

External links
Goudard in audio recordings from the 1880s.

United States Army Medal of Honor recipients
1842 births
1912 deaths
People of Massachusetts in the American Civil War
Union Army colonels
American Civil War recipients of the Medal of Honor
American people of French descent